Marsha Levine  is the founder of InterPride and is active in leading other organizations related to LGBT Pride events since 1980.  She served as San Francisco’s Pride Parade Manager for 18 years.

Levine is one of four Vice Presidents of Global Outreach at Inter Pride and Partnership Management and a Co-President of USAP (United States Association of Pride).  Past positions include working on the Boston Lesbian/Gay Pride Committee and upon moving to San Francisco in 1985, the San Francisco Lesbian, Gay, Bisexual, Transgender Pride Parade and Celebration Committee, Inc.

In 2018, Levine became the community relations and facilities manager for the San Francisco LGBT Pride Celebration Committee.

References

External links
Reflecting on Nearly Four Decades of Pride Immersion

Living people
American LGBT rights activists
Year of birth missing (living people)